Quantum Gate (2017) is roughly the 150th release and roughly 30th main studio album by Tangerine Dream. It is the first full-length album since the death of founder Edgar Froese in 2015, and is largely based on ideas and musical sketches left by Froese. The album was preceded by and is companion to the 2015 mini-album Quantum Key.

This album earned the group the most press they have had since the release of 1988's Optical Race due to the revived interest in the group following Froese's death.

CD Track listing
All titles composed by Edgar Froese, Thorsten Quaeschning, and Ulrich Schnauss, except where noted.

LP Track listing
The vinyl releases of the album feature a different track order, though this was not needed to fit the tracks onto sides.

Personnel
Edgar Froese - synthesizers, guitar
Thorsten Quaeschning - Musical director, synthesizers, guitar, steel drums, bass guitar
Ulrich Schnauss - synthesizers, sequencer
Hoshiko Yamane - violin (tracks 3, 6, 7, 8, 9)

References

External links
PledgeMusic

2017 albums
Tangerine Dream albums